Dignity Now (DA) was a Chilean political coalition formally created on 11 August 2020 between the Humanist  and Equality parties, to which various social and political organizations have joined.

History 
Dignidad Ahora was officially presented on 11 August 2020 through an act in the Plaza Baquedano in Santiago de Chile. In addition to the PH and the PI, the group was formed at the time of its foundation by the groups Acción Popular de Valparaíso, Victoria Popular, Maule Piensa, Fuerza Cultural, Pirate Party, Movimiento Democrático Popular and Poder Electoral Constituyente.

The coalition's first participation was in the 2021 municipal elections; the pact was registered on 6 January of that year. In these elections he won 3 mayorships and 55 councilors, one of the most emblematic cases being that of Italo Bravo (PI), who was elected as mayor of Pudahuel.

On 16 August 2021, the Humanist and Equality parties revalidated the Dignity Now coalition by registering it as an electoral pact for the November parliamentary elections.

Composition 
It is currently made up of the following parties:

References

2020 establishments in Chile
2022 disestablishments in Chile
Defunct left-wing political party alliances
Defunct political party alliances in Chile
Left-wing political party alliances
Political parties disestablished in 2022
Political parties established in 2020